Griburius is a genus of case-bearing leaf beetles in the family Chrysomelidae. There are about 6 described species in Griburius.

Species
 Griburius equestris (Olivier, 1808)
 Griburius larvatus (Newman, 1840)
 Griburius lecontii Crotch, 1873
 Griburius montezuma (Suffrian, 1852)
 Griburius scutellaris (Fabricius, 1801)

References

 Riley, Edward G., Shawn M. Clark, and Terry N. Seeno (2003). "Catalog of the leaf beetles of America north of Mexico (Coleoptera: Megalopodidae, Orsodacnidae and Chrysomelidae, excluding Bruchinae)". Coleopterists Society Special Publication no. 1, 290.

Further reading

 Arnett, R. H. Jr., M. C. Thomas, P. E. Skelley and J. H. Frank. (eds.). (21 June 2002). American Beetles, Volume II: Polyphaga: Scarabaeoidea through Curculionoidea. CRC Press LLC, Boca Raton, Florida .
 
 Richard E. White. (1983). Peterson Field Guides: Beetles. Houghton Mifflin Company.

Cryptocephalinae
Chrysomelidae genera